Cholistani is a Zebu breed of Punjab in Pakistan and India primarily used in dairy production. 
Cholistani originated from Cholistan Desert area particularly from Rahim Yar Khan, Bahawalpur and Bahawalnagar.

Description
Cholistani is a large cattle with white coat with brown/black spots or vice versa normally cholistani cow can milk 13 to 15 litres per day bulls are use for beef and their weight are 800 to 900 kg. Their price is between 200000 to 250000 Pakistani rupees. They have good immune system and are use for both milk and beef. Cross cow with holstein friesian cow have 25 to 30 kg milk with average feeding.

The hump on the back of Cholistani cattle is its distinctive feature as it is larger than any other breed whilst sharing same size of hump with Dhanni of Punjab, Pakistan from Chakwal District.

References

Livestock in Punjab
Fauna of Pakistan
Cattle breeds originating in Pakistan
Cholistan Desert
Economy of Bahawalpur
Cattle breeds originating in India